Jeju International Broadcasting System or JIBS is a radio and TV station that is affiliated with the SBS Network, in Jeju Province, South Korea, and it were originally established on April 10, 1994, though it had started its demo emissions, and then later, it had therefore begun its test transmissions on December 7, 2001, as well as it soon commences its official broadcasts from May 31, 2002.

Stations

 Television
Channel - Ch. 33 (LCN 6-1)
Launched - May 31, 2002
Affiliated to - SBS
Call Sign - HLKJ-DTV
 FM radio (New Power FM)
Frequency - FM 101.5 MHz (Jeju City), FM 98.5 MHz (Seogwipo City), FM 95.9 MHz (Hallim)
Launched - January 4, 2003
Affiliated to - SBS
Call Sign - HLQC-FM

See also
SBS (Korea)

External links
 

Seoul Broadcasting System affiliates
Television channels in South Korea
Television channels and stations established in 1994
1994 establishments in South Korea
Mass media in Jeju City